Mgr. Vladimír Socha (born 1 January 1982 in Hradec Králové) is a Czech writer, publisher, public lecturer and science promoter from the city of Hradec Králové (north-eastern Czech Republic). His main interest lies in dinosaur paleontology and the history of science in general. So far, he published fifteen books about dinosaurs and primeval life in Czech, six smaller brochures (booklets) and many magazine articles about nature, history and prehistory. In 2009 he volunteered in the summer paleontological field dig in the Hell Creek formation in eastern Montana (for the Museum of the Rockies in Bozeman). A year later, he published a book about the experience called Dinosauři od Pekelného potoka (Dinosaurs from the Hell Creek). He also provides interviews for the Czech Radio and sometimes organises paleoart exhibitions.

Published book titles 
  (Magnificent World of Dinosaurs), Triton, 2009 (2nd edition 2012)
  (Encyclopedia of Dinosaurs in the Light of new Discoveries), Libri, 2010
  (Dinosaurs from the Hell Creek), Motto, 2010
  (In the Footsteps of Dinosaurs), Triton, 2011
  (Strange Dragons, brochure), Triton, 2013
  (Discoveries under the Layers of Time), Computer Press, 2014
  (Prehistory of the Czech Lands, brochure), Triton, 2015
  (Prehistoric Rulers of the Skies, brochure), Triton, 2015
  (Unknown Dinosaurs), Mladá fronta, 2015
  (The Last Days of Dinosaurs), Radioservis, 2016
  (Dinosaur Record Holders, brochure), Triton, 2016
  (Dinosaurs in the Czech Republic), Vyšehrad, 2017
  (A Trip to the Universe), Triton, 2017
  ("The Great Extinction at the end of the Cretaceous"), Pavel Mervart, 2017
  (The Last Day of the Mesozoic), Vyšehrad, 2018
  (New journey to prehistory), CPress, 2019
  Tyrannosaurus rex (A legend named Tyrannosaurus rex), Pavel Mervart, 2019
  (Dinosaurs) (small book/booklet), Bylo nebylo, 2019
  (Monsters of the primeval seas, brochure), Triton, 2019
  ("Prehistoric rulers of Europe"), Kazda. 2020
  (Dinosaurs - Records and Curiosities), Kazda 2021

References

External links 

 Personal blog of Vladimír Socha (in Czech)
 Short biography in english (personal blog)
 Profile on the Wild Prehistory website (in Czech)
 Articles of V. Socha on the Osel.cz website (in Czech)
 Interview with Vladimír Socha on website iDnes.cz (in Czech)
 Interview with Vladimír Socha for a Czech television (ČT24, in Czech)
 Vladimír Socha's lecture about dinosaur extinction, Brno Planetarium, October 27th, 2016 (in Czech)

Czech male writers
Czech scientists
1982 births
Living people